The Nypano Railroad, earlier the New York, Pennsylvania and Ohio Railroad, was organized from the bankrupt Atlantic and Great Western Railroad in March 1880.

The road was owned by five of the English investors in the A&GW and ran from Salamanca, New York to Dayton, Ohio.  J. H. Devereaux, former president of the A&GW, was elected first president of the new company. Devereaux was succeeded by Jarvis M. Adams who, on March 6, 1883, leased the NYP&O to the New York, Lake Erie and Western Railroad. On February 27, 1896 the property was sold under foreclosure to representatives of the Erie Railroad, and subsequently reorganized as the Nypano. The company was merged into the Erie in 1941.

The NYP&O was originally built as a  broad gauge line.

External links
Western New York Railroad Archive

References

Hungerford, Edward. Men of Erie: A Story of Human Effort. New York:  Random House, 1946.
Mott, Edward. Between the Ocean and the Lakes - The Story of Erie. New York, NY: J.S. Collins. 1899.

Defunct New York (state) railroads
Defunct Pennsylvania railroads
Defunct Ohio railroads
Predecessors of the Erie Railroad
Railway companies established in 1896
Railway companies disestablished in 1941
6 ft gauge railways in the United States